A mango is an edible stone fruit produced by the tropical tree Mangifera indica. It is believed to have originated between northwestern Myanmar, Bangladesh, and northeastern India. M. indica has been cultivated in South and Southeast Asia since ancient times resulting in two types of modern mango cultivars: the "Indian type" and the "Southeast Asian type". Other species in the genus Mangifera also produce edible fruits that are also called "mangoes", the majority of which are found in the Malesian ecoregion.

Worldwide, there are several hundred cultivars of mango. Depending on the cultivar, mango fruit varies in size, shape, sweetness, skin color, and flesh color, which may be pale yellow, gold, green, or orange. Mango is the national fruit of India, Pakistan and the Philippines, while the mango tree is the national tree of Bangladesh.

Etymology 
The English word mango (plural "mangoes" or "mangos") originated in the 16th century from the Portuguese word, manga, from the Malay mangga, and ultimately from the Tamil man ("mango tree") + kay ("fruit"). The scientific name, Mangifera indica, refers to a plant bearing mangoes in India.

Description 

The trees are long-lived, as some specimens still fruit after 300 years.

Over 500 varieties of mangoes are known, many of which ripen in summer, while some give a double crop. The fruit takes four to five months from flowering to ripening.

The ripe fruit varies according to cultivar in size, shape, color, sweetness, and eating quality. Depending on the cultivar, fruits are variously yellow, orange, red, or green. The fruit has a single flat, oblong pit that can be fibrous or hairy on the surface and does not separate easily from the pulp. The skin is leather-like, waxy, smooth, and fragrant, with colors ranging from green to yellow, yellow-orange, yellow-red, or blushed with various shades of red, purple, pink, or yellow when fully ripe.

Ripe intact mangoes give off a distinctive resinous, sweet smell. Mangoes have recalcitrant seeds which do not survive freezing and drying. Mango trees grow readily from seeds, with germination success highest when seeds are obtained from mature fruits.

Taxonomy 

Mangoes originated from the region between northwestern Myanmar, Bangladesh, and northeastern India. The mango is considered an evolutionary anachronism, whereby seed dispersal was once accomplished by a now-extinct evolutionary forager, such as a megafauna mammal.

From their center of origin, mangoes diverged into two genetically distinct populations: the subtropical Indian group and the tropical Southeast Asian group. The Indian group is characterized by having monoembryonic fruits, while polyembryonic fruits characterize the Southeast Asian group.

It was previously believed that mangoes originated from a single domestication event in South Asia before being spread to Southeast Asia, but a 2019 study found no evidence of a center of diversity in India. Instead, it identified a higher unique genetic diversity in Southeast Asian cultivars than in Indian cultivars, indicating that mangoes may have originally been domesticated first in Southeast Asia before being introduced to South Asia. However, the authors also cautioned that the diversity in Southeast Asian mangoes might be the result of other reasons (like interspecific hybridization with other Mangifera species native to the Malesian ecoregion). Nevertheless, the existence of two distinct genetic populations also identified by the study indicates that the domestication of the mango is more complex than previously assumed and would at least indicate multiple domestication events in Southeast Asia and South Asia.

Cultivars 

There are many hundreds of named mango cultivars. In mango orchards, several cultivars are often grown to improve pollination. Many desired cultivars are monoembryonic and must be propagated by grafting, or they do not breed true. A common monoembryonic cultivar is 'Alphonso', an important export product, considered "the king of mangoes."

Cultivars that excel in one climate may fail elsewhere. For example, Indian cultivars such as 'Julie,' a prolific cultivar in Jamaica, require annual fungicide treatments to escape the lethal fungal disease anthracnose in Florida. Asian mangoes are resistant to anthracnose.

The current world market is dominated by the cultivar 'Tommy Atkins', a seedling of 'Haden' that first fruited in 1940 in southern Florida and was initially rejected commercially by Florida researchers. Growers and importers worldwide have embraced the cultivar for its excellent productivity and disease resistance, shelf life, transportability, size, and appealing color. Although the Tommy Atkins cultivar is commercially successful, other cultivars may be preferred by consumers for eating pleasure, such as Alphonso.

Generally, ripe mangoes have an orange-yellow or reddish peel and are juicy for eating, while exported fruit are often picked while underripe with green peels. Although producing ethylene while ripening, unripened exported mangoes do not have the same juiciness or flavor as fresh fruit.

Distribution and habitat 

From tropical Asia, mangoes were introduced to East Africa by Arab and Persian traders in the ninth to tenth centuries. The 14th-century Moroccan traveler Ibn Battuta reported it at Mogadishu. It was spread further into other areas around the world during the Colonial Era. The Portuguese Empire spread the mango from their colony in Goa to East and West Africa. From West Africa, they introduced it to Brazil from the 16th to the 17th centuries. From Brazil, it spread northwards to the Caribbean and eastern Mexico by the mid to late 18th century. The Spanish Empire also introduced mangoes directly from the Philippines to western Mexico via the Manila galleons from at least the 16th century. Mangoes were only introduced to Florida by 1833.

Cultivation 
The mango is now cultivated in most frost-free tropical and warmer subtropical climates. It is cultivated extensively in South Asia, Southeast Asia, East and West Africa, the tropical and subtropical Americas, and the Caribbean. Mangoes are also grown in Andalusia, Spain (mainly in Málaga province), as its coastal subtropical climate is one of the few places in mainland Europe that permits the growth of tropical plants and fruit trees. The Canary Islands are another notable Spanish producer of the fruit. Other minor cultivators include North America (in South Florida and the California Coachella Valley), Hawai'i, and Australia.

Many commercial cultivars are grafted onto the cold-hardy rootstock of the Gomera-1 mango cultivar, originally from Cuba. Its root system is well adapted to a coastal Mediterranean climate. Many of the 1,000+ mango cultivars are easily cultivated using grafted saplings, ranging from the "turpentine mango" (named for its strong taste of turpentine) to the Bullock's Heart. Dwarf or semidwarf varieties serve as ornamental plants and can be grown in containers. A wide variety of diseases can afflict mangoes.

An important breakthrough in mango cultivation is the use of potassium nitrate and ethrel to induce flowering in mangoes. The discovery was made by Filipino horticulturist Ramon Barba in 1974 and was developed from the unique traditional method of inducing mango flowering using smoke in the Philippines. It allowed mango plantations to induce regular flowering and fruiting year-round. Previously, mangoes were seasonal because they only flowered every 16 to 18 months. The method is now used in most mango-producing countries.

Production 
In 2020, world production of mangoes (report includes mangosteens and guavas) was 55 million tonnes, led by India with 45% of the total (table). Almost half of the world's mangoes are cultivated in India alone, with the second-largest source being Indonesia. Although India is the largest producer of mangoes, it accounts for less than 1% of the international mango trade; India consumes most of its own production.

Other major mango-producing countries in total tonnage produced in 2020 were Indonesia, China, Pakistan, Mexico, Brazil, Bangladesh, Nigeria, and the Philippines (table).

At the wholesale level, the price of mangoes varies according to size, variety, and other factors. The FOB Price reported by the United States Department of Agriculture for all mangoes imported into the US ranged from approximately US$4.60 (average low price) to $5.74 (average high price) per box (4 kg/box) during 2018.

Uses 

Mangoes are generally sweet, although the taste and texture of the flesh vary across cultivars; some, such as Alphonso, have a soft, pulpy, juicy texture similar to an overripe plum, while others, such as Tommy Atkins, are firmer, like a cantaloupe or avocado, with a fibrous texture.

The skin of unripe, pickled, or cooked mango can be eaten, but it has the potential to cause contact dermatitis of the lips, gingiva, or tongue in susceptible people.

Mangoes are used in many cuisines. Sour, unripe mangoes are used in chutneys (i.e. Mango chutney), pickles, daals and other side dishes in Bengali cuisine. A summer drink called aam panna is made with mangoes. Mango pulp made into jelly or cooked with red gram dhal and green chilies may be served with cooked rice. Mango lassi is popular throughout South Asia, prepared by mixing ripe mangoes or mango pulp with buttermilk and sugar. Ripe mangoes are also used to make curries. Aamras is a popular thick juice made of mangoes with sugar or milk and is consumed with chapatis or pooris. The pulp from ripe mangoes is also used to make jam called mangada. Andhra aavakaaya is a pickle made from raw, unripe, pulpy, and sour mango mixed with chili powder, fenugreek seeds, mustard powder, salt, and groundnut oil. Mango is also used in Andhra Pradesh to make dahl preparations. Gujarat uses mango to make chunda (a sweet and spicy, grated mango delicacy).

Mangoes are used to make murabba (fruit preserves), muramba (a sweet, grated mango delicacy), amchur (dried and powdered unripe mango), and pickles, including a spicy mustard-oil pickle and alcohol. Ripe mangoes are often cut into thin layers, desiccated, folded and then cut. In some countries, these bars are similar to dried guava fruit bars. The fruit is also added to cereal products such as muesli and oat granola. Mangoes are often prepared charred in Hawaii.

Mango is used to make juices, smoothies, ice cream, fruit bars, raspados, aguas frescas, pies, and sweet chili sauce, or mixed with chamoy, a sweet and spicy chili paste. It is popular on a stick dipped in hot chili powder and salt or as a main ingredient in fresh fruit combinations. In Central America, mango is either eaten green, mixed with salt, vinegar, black pepper, and hot sauce, or ripe in various forms.

Pieces of mango can be mashed and used as a topping on ice cream or blended with milk and ice as milkshakes. Sweet glutinous rice is flavored with coconut, then served with sliced mango as a dessert. In other parts of Southeast Asia, mangoes are pickled with fish sauce and rice vinegar. Green mangoes can be used in mango salad with fish sauce and dried shrimp. Mango with condensed milk may be used as a topping for shaved ice.

Raw green mangoes can be sliced and eaten like a salad. In most parts of Southeast Asia, they are commonly eaten with fish sauce, vinegar, soy sauce, or with a dash of salt (plain or spicy)a combination usually known as "mango salad" in English.

In the Philippines, green mangoes are also commonly eaten with bagoong (salty fish or shrimp paste), salt, soy sauce, vinegar, and/or chilis. Mango float and mango cake, which use slices of ripe mangoes, are also popular in the Philippines. Dried strips of sweet, ripe mango (sometimes combined with seedless tamarind to form mangorind) are also popular. Mangoes may be used to make juices, mango nectar, and as a flavoring and major ingredient in mango ice cream and sorbetes.

The seed kernels can be roasted and eaten.

Phytochemistry 

Numerous phytochemicals are present in mango peel and pulp, such as the triterpene lupeol. Mango peel pigments under study include carotenoids, such as the provitamin A compound, beta-carotene, lutein and alpha-carotene, and polyphenols, such as quercetin, kaempferol, gallic acid, caffeic acid, catechins and tannins. Mango contains a unique xanthonoid called mangiferin.

Phytochemical and nutrient content appears to vary across mango cultivars. Up to 25 different carotenoids have been isolated from mango pulp, the densest of which was beta-carotene, which accounts for the yellow-orange pigmentation of most mango cultivars. Mango leaves also have significant polyphenol content, including xanthonoids, mangiferin and gallic acid.

Flavor 
The flavor of mango fruits is conferred by several volatile organic chemicals mainly belonging to terpene, furanone, lactone, and ester classes. Different varieties or cultivars of mangoes can have flavors made up of different volatile chemicals or the same volatile chemicals in different quantities. In general, New World mango cultivars are characterized by the dominance of δ-3-carene, a monoterpene flavorant; whereas, high concentration of other monoterpenes such as (Z)-ocimene and myrcene, as well as the presence of lactones and furanones, is the unique feature of Old World cultivars. In India, 'Alphonso' is one of the most popular cultivars. In 'Alphonso' mango, the lactones and furanones are synthesized during ripening, whereas terpenes and the other flavorants are present in both the developing (immature) and ripening fruits. Ethylene, a ripening-related hormone well known to be involved in ripening of mango fruits, causes changes in the flavor composition of mango fruits upon exogenous application, as well. In contrast to the huge amount of information available on the chemical composition of mango flavor, the biosynthesis of these chemicals has not been studied in depth; only a handful of genes encoding the enzymes of flavor biosynthetic pathways have been characterized to date.

Toxicity
Contact with oils in mango leaves, stems, sap, and skin can cause dermatitis and anaphylaxis in susceptible individuals. Those with a history of contact dermatitis induced by urushiol (an allergen found in poison ivy, poison oak, or poison sumac) may be most at risk for mango contact dermatitis. Other mango compounds potentially responsible for dermatitis or allergic reactions include mangiferin. Cross-reactions may occur between mango allergens and urushiol. Sensitized individuals may not be able to eat peeled mangos or drink mango juice safely.

When mango trees are flowering in spring, local people with allergies may experience breathing difficulty, itching of the eyes, or facial swelling, even before flower pollen becomes airborne. In this case, the irritant is likely to be the vaporized essential oil from flowers. During the primary ripening season of mangoes, contact with mango plant parts – primarily sap, leaves, and fruit skin – is the most common cause of plant dermatitis in Hawaii.

Nutrition

A raw mango is 84% water, 15% carbohydrates, 1% protein, and has negligible fat (table). The energy value per 100 g (3.5 oz) serving of raw mango is 250 kJ (60 calories). Fresh mango contains only vitamin C and folate in significant amounts of the Daily Value as 44% and 11%, respectively (table).

Culture 

The mango is the national fruit of India. It is also the national tree of Bangladesh. In India, harvest and sale of mangoes is during March–May and this is annually covered by news agencies.

The mango has a traditional context in the culture of South Asia. In his edicts, the Mauryan emperor Ashoka references the planting of fruit- and shade-bearing trees along imperial roads:

"On the roads banyan-trees were caused to be planted by me, (in order that) they might afford shade to cattle and men, (and) mango-groves were caused to be planted."

In medieval India, the Indo-Persian poet Amir Khusrow termed the mango "Naghza Tarin Mewa Hindustan" – "the fairest fruit of Hindustan." Mangoes were enjoyed at the court of the Delhi Sultan Alauddin Khijli. The Mughal Empire was especially fond of the fruits: Babur praises the mango in his Babarnameh. At the same time, Sher Shah Suri inaugurated the creation of the Chaunsa variety after his victory over the Mughal emperor Humayun. Mughal patronage of horticulture led to the grafting of thousands of mangoes varieties, including the famous Totapuri, which was the first variety to be exported to Iran and Central Asia. Akbar (15561605) is said to have planted a mango orchard of 100,000 trees near Darbhanga, Bihar, while Jahangir and Shah Jahan ordered the planting of mango orchards in Lahore and Delhi and the creation of mango-based desserts.

The Jain goddess Ambika is traditionally represented as sitting under a mango tree. Mango blossoms are also used in the worship of the goddess Saraswati. Mango leaves decorate archways and doors in Indian houses during weddings and celebrations such as Ganesh Chaturthi. Mango motifs and paisleys are widely used in different Indian embroidery styles, and are found in Kashmiri shawls, Kanchipuram and silk sarees. In Tamil Nadu, the mango is referred to as one of the three royal fruits, along with banana and jackfruit, for their sweetness and flavor. This triad of fruits is referred to as ma-pala-vazhai. The classical Sanskrit poet Kālidāsa sang the praises of mangoes.

Mangoes were the subject of the mango cult in China during the Cultural Revolution as symbols of chairman Mao Zedong's love for the people.

See also 

 Achaar, South Asian pickles, commonly containing mango and lime
 Amchoor, mango powder
 Mangifera caesia, a related species also widely cultivated for its fruit in Southeast Asia
 Mango mealybug
 Mango pickle – Mangai-oorkai (manga-achar), South Indian hot mango pickle

References

Further reading 
 
 Litz, Richard E. (editor, 2009). The Mango: Botany, Production and Uses. 2nd edition. CABI. .
 Susser, Allen (2001). The Great Mango Book: A Guide with Recipes. Ten Speed Press. .

External links 

 Sorting Mangifera species
 Pine Island Nursery's Mango Variety viewer

 
Crops
Fruits originating in Asia
Indian spices
Medicinal plants
National symbols of Bangladesh
National symbols of Pakistan
Drupes
Edible fruits